Bosscha Observatory is the oldest modern observatory in Indonesia, and one of the oldest in Asia. The IAU observatory code for Bosscha is 299.

History
During the first meeting of the Nederlandsch-Indische Sterrekundige Vereeniging (Dutch-Indies Astronomical Society) in the 1920s, it was agreed that an observatory was needed to study astronomy in the Dutch East Indies. Of all locations in the Indonesia archipelago, a tea plantation in Malabar, a few kilometers north of Bandung in West Java was selected. It is on the hilly north side of the city with a non-obstructed view of the sky and with close access to the city that was planned to become the new capital of the Dutch colony, replacing Batavia (present-day Jakarta). The observatory is named after the tea plantation owner Karel Albert Rudolf Bosscha, son of the physicist Johannes Bosscha and a major force in the development of science and technology in the Dutch East Indies, who granted six hectares of his property for the new observatory.

Construction of the observatory began in 1923 and was completed in 1928. Since then a continuous observation of the sky was made. The first international publication from Bosscha was published in 1922. Observations from Bosscha were halted during World War II and after the war a major reconstruction was necessary. On 17 October 1951, the Dutch-Indies Astronomical Society handed over operation of the observatory to the government of Indonesia. In 1959 the observatory's operation was given to the Institut Teknologi Bandung and has been an integral part of the research and formal education of astronomy in Indonesia.

Facilities

Five large telescopes were installed in Bosscha:
 The Zeiss double refractor
This telescope is mainly used to observe visual binary stars, conduct photometric studies on eclipsing binaries, image lunar craters, observe planets (Mars, Saturn and Jupiter) and to observe comet details and other heavy bodies.
 The Schmidt telescope (nicknamed the Bima Sakti, or "Milky Way" telescope) 
 This telescope is used to study galactic structure, stellar spectra, asteroid studies, supernovae, and to photograph heavy bodies. It is also equipped with a spectral prism with a prime angle of 6.10 degrees for stellar spectra, a wedge sensitometer and a film recorder.
 The Bamberg refractor (not to be mixed-up with the Bamberg-Refraktor in Berlin)
 This telescope is used to determine stellar magnitude, stellar distance, and photometric studies of eclipsing stars, solar imaging, and others. It is equipped with a photoelectric photometer, has a  lens diameter with  meter of focal length.
 The Cassegrain GOTO
 This was a gift from the Japanese government. This computer controlled telescope can automatically view objects from a database and this was the first digital telescope at Bosscha. The telescope is also equipped with a photometer and spectrometer-spectrograph.
 The Unitron refractor
 This telescope is used for observing hilal, lunar eclipse, solar eclipse and sunspot photography, and also other objects.

Directors

1923 - 1940   : Dr. J. Voûte
1940 - 1942   : Dr. Aernout de Sitter
1942 - 1946   : Prof. Dr. Masashi Miyaji
1946 - 1949   : Prof. Dr. Coert Hendrik Hins
1949 - 1958   : Prof. Dr. Gale Bruno van Albada
1958 - 1959   : Prof. Dr. Ong Ping Hok, Dr. Kusumanto Purbosiswoyo (1959-1960) and Santoso Nitisastro (temporary officers)
1959 - 1968   : Prof. Dr. The Pik Sin
1968 - 1999   : Prof. Dr. Bambang Hidayat
1999 - 2004   : Dr. Moedji Raharto
2004 - 2006   : Dr. Dhani Herdiwijaya
2006 - 2009   : Prof. Dr. Taufiq Hidayat
2009 - 2012   : Dr. Hakim L. Malasan
2012 - 2018: Dr. Mahasena Putra
2018 - present: Dr. Premana W Primadi

In popular culture

The popular American reality TV Series The Amazing Race 23 used this site as a Pit Stop for its 9th leg. The episode that used this site for filming was nominated for the Emmys in several categories and won the Outstanding Reality-Competition Program award.

See also
 List of astronomical observatories

References

External links
 
 Timau, SE Asia's largest telescope under construction in Timor, NTT, at similar elevation, due 2019.

Astronomy institutes and departments
Astronomical observatories in Indonesia
Buildings and structures in West Java
Bandung Institute of Technology